Brian Brendell (born 7 September 1986, in Rehoboth) is a Namibian football midfielder with FC Civics of the Namibia Premier League. A  member of the Namibia national football team, he competed with the team at the 2008 Africa Cup of Nations.

External links
Player profile

1986 births
Living people
Namibian men's footballers
Namibia international footballers
2008 Africa Cup of Nations players
Association football midfielders
F.C. Civics Windhoek players
People from Rehoboth, Namibia